The Akwesasne Indians are Junior "B" box lacrosse team from Akwesasne (the borderlands between Ontario, Quebec, and New York). The Indians compete in the OLA Junior B Lacrosse League.

History
The Akwesasne Lightning joined the OJBLL in 1996. They joined around the same time that the other major Iroquois teams, Onondaga Warriors and Kahnawake Mohawks, joined the OLA. Onondaga and Kahnawake walked away after a few years in the league to join the Iroquois Nations Junior B Lacrosse League, but Akwesasne decided to stay and have become a top team in the OJBLL.

The team is from the Akwesasne Reserve. The reserve sits on the border between Canada and the United States where Ontario, Quebec, and New York meet. This location is unique as the rest of the teams in the league are based out of Canadian cities and towns.

After a dismal 5-17-0 first season, the Lightning never slipped below a .500 record until 2007. In 2004, the Lightning won their first division title in the Eastern Conference with a 17-1-2 record.

After the 2008 season, the Lightning went on a 1-year hiatus due to a tough economic drop, and not enough money to finance the team. The team returned in 2010.

In 2014, the team changed their name to the Akwesasne Indians.

Season-by-season results
Note: GP = Games played, W = Wins, L = Losses, T = Ties, Pts = Points, GF = Goals for, GA = Goals against

Founders Cup
CANADIAN NATIONAL CHAMPIONSHIPS

References

External links
OJBLL website
@AkwesasneLax

Akwesasne
Ontario Lacrosse Association teams
Lacrosse of the Iroquois Confederacy
Lacrosse clubs established in 1996
1996 establishments in Ontario